Carlos Hernán Peña González (Chile, June 8, 1959) is a lawyer and university professor who is since 2005 rector of the Diego Portales University and Sunday columnist of El Mercurio. Peña is also vicepresident of CIPER Chile; member of the directory of Fundación Nicanor Parra; Counsellor of Teatro Municipal de Santiago; member of the directory of Museo de la Memoria y los Derechos Humanos and member of the Comisión de Verdad Histórica y Nuevo Trato con los Pueblos Indígenas (2001-2003). He was also a government advisor in the Reforma Procesal Penal (1994-2000) and family law (1989-1994).

References

1959 births
Living people
20th-century Chilean lawyers
Chilean sociologists
Chilean columnists
Pontifical Catholic University of Chile alumni
University of Chile alumni
Academic staff of Diego Portales University
Heads of universities in Chile
21st-century Chilean lawyers
Chilean political commentators